Wallace Charles Milne (13 December 1910 – 31 July 1990) was an Australian rules footballer who played with Essendon in the Victorian Football League (VFL).

Milne later served in the Australian Army during World War II.

Notes

External links 

1910 births
1990 deaths
Australian rules footballers from Melbourne
Essendon Football Club players
People from Essendon, Victoria
Australian Army personnel of World War II
Military personnel from Melbourne